Wągrodno  is a village in the administrative district of Gmina Ruja, within Legnica County, Lower Silesian Voivodeship, in south-western Poland. 

The village has a population of 276.

References

Villages in Legnica County